Zhao Qi is a character featured within the famed classic Chinese novel Fengshen Yanyi.

Zhao Qi is renowned as a Grand Counselor during the Shang Dynasty. When the princes had finally been both caught and hung up within the executional area, Zhao Qi would boldly tear up the executional edict sent by the king himself. Thus, Zhao Qi was seemingly the equal of Shang Rong, who as well came to elaborate the idiocy of the king. 

After Shang Rong's unfortunate death within the throne hall before the king, Zhao Qi would also speak his ultimate beliefs. Even after being threatened with death by King Zhou, Zhao Qi would spout the words "I have no fear of dying. My death will let future generations know how I feel about your termination of Cheng Tang's reign! May your foul name stink for millions of years!" Thus, Zhao Qi died with his fellow friend Shang Rong as a bold figure that would forever serve as a loyal sword of Cheng Tang.

Zhao Qi was appointed as the deity of Tianshe Star (天赦星) in the end.

Notes

References
Investiture of the Gods - chapter 9

Chinese gods
Investiture of the Gods characters